The 1935 Royal Canadian Mounted Police Killings were a series of murders of three Royal Canadian Mounted Police and one local constable from 5–8 October 1935.  They began with the murders of Benito Constable William Wainwright and RCMP Constable John Shaw near Pelly, Saskatchewan, by three Doukhobor men who had been in the custody of the officers. This led to a shootout which killed two additional RCMP officers in Banff, Alberta, and the death of perpetrator Joseph Posnikoff. The remaining two perpetrators were shot by Banff Park Game Warden William Neish, as they were pursued by a combined posse of RCMP officers and armed civilian volunteers.

The ordeals involved RCMP detachments from three provinces in western Canada and remained one of the deadliest incidents in RCMP history until the Mayerthorpe tragedy in 2005. With the death of all perpetrators, the motivations of the perpetrators remain unknown.

Pelly Shooting
The initial murders began late in the evening of 4 October 1935 when three local Doukhobor farmers in Benito, Manitoba, including John Kalmakoff, Joseph Posnikoff, and Peter Woiken were apprehended by officer Wainwright and Shaw under suspicion of having been involved in a bank robbery and loaded into Shaw's unmarked police vehicle. As with common practice at the period, none of the men had been searched before they had entered the vehicle. For reasons unknown, both officers were attacked with knives and a .32 revolver that had been smuggled into the police vehicle at approximately 04:00 CST on 5 October 1935, en route to the RCMP detachment building in Pelly.

Wainwright was subsequently stabbed and shot with his own revolver, while Shaw was also stabbed and later shot three times with the smuggled .32 revolver as he attempted to ward off the attackers and drive the vehicle. The car crashed into a ditch, and the three perpetrators looted the vehicle leaving behind the corpses of the slain officers.  Their bodies were discovered by a local farmer on 7 October 1935 and this was immediately reported to the authorities.

Banff shootout
After the bodies of Wainwright and Shaw were discovered, the news of the murders and information about suspects had been relayed to RCMP detachments across Western Canada. By 19:00 MST on 7 October 1935, news had been communicated into Alberta and the off-duty Sergeant Thomas Seller Wallace and Constable G.E. Combe, joined forces with uniformed officers George "Scotty" Harrison and Grey Campbell had been mobilized to join in the search for the fugitives. At about 19:20 MST on 7 October, the fugitives pulled into a service station 20 kilometres east of Canmore, Alberta, to buy only one gallon of gas, an odd request. Lucille and Roy Zeller, the owners of the station, recognized the suspects from the descriptions being broadcast on the radio, and called police, informing Constable Campbell that they were heading west. The disorganized suspects had begun to realize that they had no real escape plan and were running out of money. On 8 October 1935, the perpetrators robbed a vehicle driven by C.T. Scott, having his money and wristwatch stolen by the disoriented fugitives. They bizarrely informed him that they would return his wristwatch if he did not inform the police and continued to follow his vehicle westward as it drove towards Banff. As the two vehicles arrived in Banff, Scott stopped his vehicle before an RCMP checkpoint near the eastern gate of Banff National Park and informed the uniformed Campbell that the men in the vehicle following him had just robbed him.

As Wallace and Harrison approached the vehicle, two shots through the windshield were fired by its occupants, hitting both officers. The officers continued to engage the fugitives but had been mortally wounded. Harrison had been shot in the neck, and managed to shoot out the headlights of the vehicle before losing consciousness. Wallace, a distinguished World War I veteran and renowned marksman, fired his service revolver until he was low on ammunition and collapsed from his wounds  After the shoot out, the three perpetrators headed for the bush pursued by Combe as Campbell loaded the wounded officers into his police vehicle. Combe managed to catch a glimpse of Joseph Posnikoff hiding in the bush and was able to fire his revolver, killing Posnikoff instantly and recovering Wainwright's stolen revolver.

Death of Kalmakoff and Woiken
By the evening of 8 October 1935, enraged residents had armed themselves and formed posses to help the RCMP track down the two remaining fugitives. The search team involved Sergeant John Cawsey and his dog Dale, one of the first police dogs employed by the RCMP. Ultimately, the fugitives were detected by Banff Park Game Warden and ex-RCMP officer William Neish. As the weather conditions worsening from rain to blowing snow, and with the assistance of Dale, Neish spotted the two fugitives and called for them to surrender. The fugitives began to exchange gunfire with Neish's party, until Neish himself managed to mortally wound Woiken after a volley of gunfire. Neish quickly also identified Kalmakoff from the glint of his Winchester rifle barrel, and managed to also mortally wound him with another aimed shot.

Aftermath
Woiken and Kalmakoff quickly lapsed from consciousness and died the same day. With the deaths of all three perpetrators, it is unclear what had motivated the typically upright and respectable Doukhobour perpetrators to turn to criminality, and attack Constable Wainwright and Shaw. It is also unclear who fired the fatal shots that had mortally wounded Wallace and Harrison as they had engaged them in a fire fight from within their vehicle.

Wallace and Harrison both died from their wounds after being transported to Calgary, and were afforded full Masonic and military funeral processions. Constable Shaw, a veteran of the Royal Flying Corps, was buried with full military honours in Swan River, Manitoba.  The entirety of the event outraged the community in Banff and surrounding areas leading them to refuse burial to the three perpetrators. The Doukhobour families of the perpetrators refused to take back the bodies of Woiken and Posnikoff, and they were buried in an unmarked graved in Morley, Alberta. Kalmakoff was taken back by his family and buried in an unmarked grave in a Saskatchewan Doukhobour wheat field.

References

Canadian police officers killed in the line of duty
Crime in Manitoba
Murder in Saskatchewan
1935 in Alberta
1935 in Manitoba
1935 in Saskatchewan
1935 murders in North America
October 1935 events
Royal Canadian Mounted Police
Mass murder in Alberta